Enpuku-ji (円福寺) is a Buddhist temple of the Shingon Risshu school, in Ikoma, Nara, Japan. The main object of worship (本尊) is Amida Nyorai.

History

The official history of the temple wrote that this temple was established in the Tenpyo-Shoho years from 749 to 757 by a famous Japanese monk Gyōki (行基), however, the origin of this temple is unclear. Today, as a result of fires through many centuries, this temple has only one main hall built in the Muromachi Period in 1371.

Cultural properties
Enpuku-ji has two Important Cultural Properties selected by Japanese government:

Its Hondō (Main Hall), built in 1371
Its Hōkyōintō (a type of stone pagoda), made in 1293

Access
Ichibu Station of Kintetsu Ikoma Line

See also 
 Glossary of Japanese Buddhism, for an explanation of terms concerning Japanese Buddhism, Japanese Buddhist art, and Japanese Buddhist temple architecture, see the

References
Enpuku-ji, Digital Museum of Ikoma City (In Official Home Page of Ikoma City)
Nihon Kotsu Kosha, Nara, Nihon Kotsu Kosha, 1984, p. 138.

Buildings and structures completed in 1371
14th-century Buddhist temples
Buddhist temples in Nara Prefecture
Shingon Ritsu temples
Important Cultural Properties of Japan
1370s establishments in Japan
1371 establishments in Asia